The 2011 Men's European Volleyball League was the eighth edition of the annual Men's European Volleyball League, which featured men's national volleyball teams from twelve European countries: Austria, Belgium, Belarus, Croatia, Great Britain, Greece, Netherlands, Romania, Slovakia, Slovenia, Spain, and Turkey. A preliminary league round was played from May 25 to July 10, and the final four tournament, which was held at Košice, Slovakia, on July 16.

During the league round, competing nations were drawn into three pools of four teams, and played each other in a double round-robin system, with two matches per leg in a total of six legs. Pool winners qualified for the final four round, joining the host team. If the final four host team finished first in its league round pool, the best pool runners-up qualified for the final four.

12 teams participated in this year's edition, which was a record field.

Competing nations

Squads

League round

Pool A

|}

Leg 1

|}

Leg 2

|}

Leg 3

|}

Leg 4

|}

Leg 5

|}

Leg 6

|}

Pool B

|}

Leg 1

|}

Leg 2

|}

Leg 3

|}

Leg 4

|}

Leg 5

|}

Leg 6

|}

Pool C

|}

Leg 1

|}

Leg 2

|}

Leg 3

|}

Leg 4

|}

Leg 5

|}

Leg 6

|}

Final four
The final four was held at Košice, Slovakia on July 16/17, 2011.

Semifinals

|}

Bronze medal match

|}

Final

|}

Final standing

Awards

Most Valuable Player
  Tomáš Kmeť
Best Scorer
  Sergio Noda
Best Spiker
  Sergio Noda
Best Blocker
  Tomáš Kmeť

Best Server
  Alen Pajenk
Best Setter
  Michal Masný
Best Receiver
  Francesc Llenas
Best Libero
  Roman Ondrušek

References

External links
 Official website

European Volleyball League
E
International volleyball competitions hosted by Slovakia
2011 in Slovak sport